Sculptor Artist Bernard Stanley Pearson (born 13 September 1946)  a British Born potter and sculptor  in 1981 he set up a pottery called Clare Craft in the Suffolk town of Clare. Here, he and his team produced a range of fantasy and comical figurines.  This led to a meeting with Terry Pratchett in 1990, and Clare Craft went on to design a range of figurines based on characters from Pratchett’s Discworld novels. 

In 1997, at Pratchett’s suggestion, Pearson began crafting ‘The Unreal Estate’, a series of highly detailed architectural models based on Discworld locations, most notably the Unseen University. During this time, he and his wife Isobel also created a wide range of studio pottery based on landscape and fantasy imagery under the back stamp of ‘Bernard Pearson Ceramics’.

In 2000 he moved to the town of Wincanton in Somerset, England, where he established a Discworld centre and retail outlet called ‘The Cunning Artificer’, the name bestowed upon him by his friend Terry Pratchett. Here, he and Isobel launched more Discworld merchandise, including the ‘Discworld Stamps’. This latter collaboration with Terry Pratchett resulted in the creation of many thousands of ‘Cinderella’ stamps that are held in collections from the British Library to private collectors the world over. He also co-authored The Complete Discworld Almanack with Terry Pratchett in 2004. ‘The Cunning Artificer’ became ‘The Discworld Emporium’ in 2011 when Ian Mitchell and Reb Voyce joined the partnership and set up a successful online business shipping books and Discworld artifacts worldwide. Following the death of Terry Pratchett in 2015, Pearson took a back seat in the design and running of the Emporium.

In 2018 Pearson published his first novel Dovetail and has since continued to focus on writing. He has embarked upon several podcasts and is known for his wit and skills as a raconteur.

Works

References

External links

  
 Biography of Bernard Pearson at Discworld Emporium
 
 

1946 births
British sculptors
British male sculptors
People associated with the Discworld series
People from Wincanton
Place of birth missing (living people)
Living people